Fiona Mary Robinson (born 7 February 1969) is an Australian former professional basketball player. She played 10 seasons in the Women's National Basketball League (WNBL) and five seasons in the State Basketball League (SBL). She was a member of the Australia women's national basketball team that won the bronze medal at the 1996 Summer Olympics in Atlanta, Georgia. Four years later, at the 2000 Summer Olympics in Sydney, she was a member of the women's national handball team.

Professional career
Robinson was a state representative for her native Western Australia as a junior before accepting a scholarship to attend the Australian Institute of Sport from 1985 to 1987, where she played for the program's WNBL team. She later accepted a scholarship to attend Southwest Texas State University and represented Australia in basketball at the 1987 Summer Universiade in Zagreb.

In 1988, she played for the Perth Breakers in the WNBL. After winning the SBL MVP with the Stirling Senators in 1990, she played for the Breakers again in 1991. She also continued on with the Senators in 1991, 1992, 1993 and 1994, where she won her second SBL MVP in 1992. She played her third, fourth and fifth seasons with the Perth Breakers from 1993 to 1995, before moving to Canberra and playing for the Canberra Capitals in 1996 and 1997. She subsequently moved to Europe and played in Spain and Austria.

Personal life
For a period in the early 1990s, Robinson was known as Fiona Massara. Her surname returned to Robinson in the mid-1990s, later changing again to Fiona Hannan after marrying Andy Hannan. The two met in Canberra while she was playing for the Capitals and Andy was at the Australian Defence Force Academy. Their daughter, Ashlee Hannan, was inline to play college basketball in the United States for the University of Texas in 2019–20 but she never debuted.

References

External links
Sports-Reference profile

1969 births
Living people
Australian women's basketball players
Australian female handball players
Basketball players at the 1996 Summer Olympics
Handball players at the 2000 Summer Olympics
Olympic basketball players of Australia
Olympic handball players of Australia
Olympic bronze medalists for Australia
Basketball players from Perth, Western Australia
Olympic medalists in basketball
Perth Lynx players
Australian Institute of Sport basketball (WNBL) players
Medalists at the 1996 Summer Olympics